Sylvio Serpa (21 January 1904 – 26 August 1975), known as just Alemão, was a Brazilian footballer. He played in six matches for the Brazil national football team in 1923. He was also part of Brazil's squad for the 1923 South American Championship.

References

External links
 

1904 births
1975 deaths
Brazilian footballers
Brazil international footballers
Place of birth missing
Association footballers not categorized by position